The Kavi Subhash Metro Station, formerly New Garia Metro Station, is the southern terminal station of the Kolkata Metro Line 1 (North-South Corridor) of Kolkata Metro in Kolkata, India. It is named after poet Subhash Mukhopadhyay. This station was opened to public on the auspicious day of Mahalaya in 2010.

This metro station is at ground level and located adjacent to New Garia railway station on the Sealdah - Sonarpur section. The station will eventually become the southernmost terminal of the Kolkata Metro Line 6 (Bypass Corridor) of Kolkata Metro.

The Station

Layout

Connections

Bus 
Bus route number 1B, 206, S116 (Mini), S124 (Mini) etc. serve the station.

Train 
It is Connected to New Garia railway station on Sealdah South Mainline.

Air 
Netaji Subhash Chandra Bose International Airport is connected via VIP Road and EM Bypass, with a distance of 24.3 km.

See also
List of Kolkata Metro stations

References

External links
 
 

Kolkata Metro stations
Railway stations in Kolkata